"Psychosocial" is a song by American heavy metal band Slipknot. Released as the second single from the band's fourth studio album, All Hope Is Gone (2008). The song entered airplay on June 26, 2008 and was originally planned for release as a digital single on July 1 but was delayed and released on July 8. Slipknot performed "Psychosocial" live for the first time on July 9, 2008, at the White River Amphitheatre in Auburn, Washington. In 2008, the song was featured on the soundtrack to Marvel's Punisher: War Zone.

"Psychosocial", along with two other Slipknot songs, "Duality" and "Sulfur," was released as downloadable content for Rock Band and Rock Band 2 on December 8, 2009. It is also featured as a playable track in Guitar Hero: Warriors of Rock.

Background

Rolling Stone praised the song, saying it "slows down the tempo to bludgeon with a steady, pounding groove instead of all-out thrash in a manner reminiscent of the band's more slow-burning but still malicious second album, Iowa." They explained, "That track is capped off with a time-signature shattering guitar/drum breakdown that will leave the best air-instrumentalists stumped".

Reception and awards
In 2020, Kerrang and Louder Sound ranked the song number nine and number four, respectively, on their lists of the greatest Slipknot songs. The song was also nominated for 'Best Metal Performance' for the 51st Grammy Awards, but lost to Metallica's "My Apocalypse", and was nominated for the Kerrang! Award for Best Single.

Music video

The music video for "Psychosocial" was shot at Sound Farm studios in Jamaica, Iowa on June 30, 2008. The shoot was delayed due to an unrelated head injury sustained by turntablist Sid Wilson before the shoot, who was subsequently hospitalized. On July 18, 2008 the video premiered on MTV's FNMTV show, hosted by Pete Wentz. The video, which was directed by Paul Brown, was shot using high-end cameras which shoot 1,000 frames per second and are contrasted with traditional 35 mm hand crank camera equipment. Percussionist Shawn Crahan explained; "we have the most extreme on both ends, with nothing in the middle. That's what the video is, and nobody does that. There's an art form behind it."

During an interview with Kerrang!, guitarist Jim Root revealed that the video features the burning of the purgatory masks adorned by the band members in the splash teaser photos shown on Slipknot's website, reportedly because the masks represent the band's ego.

There are two versions of the video. One uses the album version of the song, whilst the other uses a much shorter version of the song; excluding the "Limits of the Dead!" lines.
The video was nominated to Best Rock Video at the VMA's 2008. On YouTube the video of the song had gained over 22 million views, before it was removed in December due to a dispute between Roadrunner Records' distributor, Warner Music Group, and YouTube. 

The video has since been reuploaded and has more than 428 million views on YouTube as of January 2022.

Track listing
All lyrics and music composed by Slipknot.
Promo CD
 "Psychosocial"  – 3:57
 "Psychosocial"  – 4:42
7" vinyl / Limited edition CD
 "Psychosocial" – 4:43
 "All Hope Is Gone" – 4:44
Digital download
 "Psychosocial" – 4:44
Germany Promo CD
 "Psychosocial"  – 3:57
 "All Hope Is Gone" – 4:44
 "Psychosocial"  – 4:43

Personnel

Sid Wilson – turntables
Joey Jordison – drums
Paul Gray – bass, backing vocals
Chris Fehn – toms, timpani, snare drum, backing vocals
Jim Root – lead guitar 
Craig Jones – sampler, MIDI
Shawn Crahan – gong, beer keg, snare drum, backing vocals
Mick Thomson – rhythm guitar 
Corey Taylor – lead vocals

 Dave Fortman – producer
 Colin Richardson – mixer

Charts

Certifications

References

2008 singles
2008 songs
Slipknot (band) songs
Songs written by Corey Taylor
Songs written by Paul Gray (American musician)
Songs written by Joey Jordison
Songs written by Jim Root
Roadrunner Records singles